The 1970 National Football League Draft was the 35th National Football League Draft and the first of the league's modern era, following the merger of the National Football League with the American Football League. It was held on January 27–28, 1970, at the Belmont Plaza Hotel in New York City, New York.

The first overall pick of the draft was quarterback Terry Bradshaw from Louisiana Tech University, who was taken by the Pittsburgh Steelers. Bradshaw was one of two future NFL Hall of Fame inductees drafted by the Steelers; the other being Mel Blount from Southern University in Round 3.

The last remaining active player from the 1970 draft class was kicker Mark Moseley, who played his final NFL game in the 1986 season, although he missed the 1973 season.

Player selections

Round 1

Round 2

Round 3

Round 4

Round 5

Round 6

Round 7

Round 8

Round 9

Round 10

Round 11

Round 12

Round 13

Round 14

Round 15

Round 16

Round 17

Notable undrafted players

Hall of Famers
 Terry Bradshaw, quarterback from Louisiana Tech, taken 1st round 1st overall by Pittsburgh Steelers
Inducted: Professional Football Hall of Fame class of 1989.
 Mel Blount, cornerback from Southern, taken 3rd round 53rd overall by Pittsburgh Steelers
Inducted: Professional Football Hall of Fame class of 1989.
 Jim Langer, offensive lineman from South Dakota State, undrafted and signed by Miami Dolphins
Inducted: Professional Football Hall of Fame class of 1987.
 Cliff Harris, safety from Ouachita Baptist College, undrafted and signed by Dallas Cowboys
Inducted: Professional Football Hall of Fame class of 2020.

Notes

References

External links
 NFL.com – 1970 Draft 
 databaseFootball.com – 1970 Draft
 Pro Football Hall of Fame

National Football League Draft
NFL Draft
Draft
NFL Draft
NFL Draft
American football in New York City
1970s in Manhattan
Sporting events in New York City
Sports in Manhattan